The Balboa Peninsula (also referred to as "Balboa" or "the Peninsula") is a neighborhood of the city of Newport Beach, Orange County, California. It is named after Spanish explorer Vasco Núñez de Balboa, the first European to sight the Pacific from the Americas.
Balboa is primarily residential with some commercial areas.

History

In 1888, the McFadden family, which had arrived in California c. 1849, decided their shipping business would be more successful if they moved it from the inner shores of the bay to the oceanfront, where it was connected by rail to Santa Ana. They built McFadden Wharf at the location where the Newport Pier is today. In 1899, the Federal Government allocated funds for major improvements to a new harbor at San Pedro, which would become Southern California's major seaport. The McFadden Wharf and railroad were sold to the Southern Pacific Railroad that same year, signaling the end of Newport Bay as a commercial shipping center.

In 1902, James McFadden sold his Newport townsite and about half of the peninsula to William Collins, who saw Newport Bay's resort and recreation potential. Collins took on Henry E. Huntington as a partner in the Newport Beach Company. Huntington had acquired the Pacific Electric railway system and used it to promote new communities outside of Los Angeles.

In 1905, the Pacific Electric Balboa Line was extended to Newport. Collins began dredging a channel on the north side of the bay and deposited the sand and silt on tidelands that would become Balboa Island. Newport Harbor was still largely undredged.

Boundaries
The peninsula acts as a jetty enclosing the Newport Harbor and Newport Beach's 8 islands. The Peninsula is connected from the land via Hwy 1 - Pacific Coast Hwy (PCH) at Balboa Boulevard, via Bridge at Newport Blvd from PCH and from Via Lido which connects via bridge to Lido Isle, via Bridge from Newport Island, via Bridge from Bay Isle and via Ferry Boat from Balboa Blvd and Palm St. to Balboa Island which is connected via bridge from Jamboree Rd and Hwy 1 (PCH).  The west end of Balboa Island connects via bridge to Collins Isle and the east end connects via bridge over the Grand Canal to the Little Island.  The center of the Peninsula is called Balboa Village and the end of the Peninsula is called Balboa Peninsula Point. Balboa Pier is near the Balboa Ferry in Balboa Village and about 2 miles toward PCH is Newport Pier at McFadden Square.  Linda Isle and Harbor Island connect via bridge from Bayside Dr off Hwy 1 (PCH).

Landmarks

Balboa Pavilion (established 1906)
Balboa Theater (established 1928)
Balboa Inn (established 1929)
Balboa Fun Zone
Balboa Island Ferry
Balboa Pavilion
Balboa Pier
The Crab Cooker
Dory Fishing Fleet
Lovell Beach House
Newport Elementary School
The Wedge

Gallery

References

External links

Newport Beach Elementary School
Our Lady of Mount Carmel Church

 
Neighborhoods in Newport Beach, California
Peninsulas of California